No Depression is a quarterly roots music journal with a concurrent online publication. In print, No Depression is an ad-free publication focused on long-form music reporting and deep analysis that ties contemporary artists with the long chain of American roots music. In April 2020, No Depression introduced digital versions of their print journal. While the print journal remains ad-free, the digital versions include roots-music-related advertisements. Its journal contributors include roots music artists as well as professional critics and reporters, photographers, illustrators, and artists.

Its online edition was largely crowd-sourced by contributions from a combination of writers and fans, regular columnists and staff reviewers. In 2019, the online version of the publication moved to align more with its print version variant by no longer accepting community posts.

History
No Depression was launched in September 1995 (as a quarterly) by co-editors/co-founders Grant Alden and Peter Blackstock. Kyla Fairchild, who handled the business functions of the magazine from the beginning, became a co-publisher with Alden and Blackstock in 1998. The magazine was named for the Carter Family song "No Depression in Heaven," the 1990 album No Depression by the band Uncle Tupelo, and an early AOL online discussion group on alternative country called The No Depression Folder.

No Depression has received the Utne Reader Independent Press Awards for Arts & Literature coverage, and was cited as one of the nation's Top 20 magazines of any kind in 2004 by the Chicago Tribune.

Two No Depression music festivals took place at Marymoore Park, just outside Seattle. The first was on July 11, 2009 and featured Gillian Welch, Iron and Wine, Patterson Hood and the Screwtopians, Jesse Sykes, Justin Townes Earle, Jessica Lea Mayfield, Zee Avi, and Seattle roots music all-stars. The second was August 21, 2010 and featured The Swell Season, Lucinda Williams, The Cave Singers, Alejandro Escovedo, Chuck Prophet, Sera Cahoone, and The Maldives.

The publishers announced in February 2008 that the May–June 2008 issue would be their last. Buddy Miller was featured on the cover of the final issue, with No Depression declaring him Artist of the Decade. Soon after, co-founders Alden and Blackstock sold their ownership stakes to Fairchild in 2008 and 2010, respectively. In the wake of the magazine going out of print, No Depression launched a community website (NoDepression.com) on the Ning platform in February 2009.

Fairchild sold her ownership of No Depression to FreshGrass LLC in 2014. In 2016, the FreshGrass Foundation – a nonprofit organization that supports roots musicians and music scenes around the United States – took over No Depression and the FreshGrass Festival which it operates in conjunction with Massachusetts Museum of Contemporary Art (MASS MoCA).

Return to print
In May 2015, No Depression announced it would be returning to print after seven years of being an online-only publication. According to an article by Kim Ruehl, "we’re opening up pre-orders via Kickstarter for what will be a truly unique magazine – there will be no advertisements. Instead, the articles will be accompanied only by stunning photography and original illustrations. The paper will be larger and thicker than you might remember from the original incarnation, printed by the one of the only carbon-neutral printers in North America."

History of print features
Features from the No Depression print journal (2015–present)

Cover features from the original print magazine (1995–2008)
1995:  #1:  Son Volt (Fall)
1996:  #2:  Blue Mountain (Winter), #3:  Steve Earle (Spring), #4:  Honey Wilds (Summer), #5:  Wilco (Sept–Oct), #6:  Jason & the Scorchers (Nov–Dec)
1997:  #7:  The Waco Brothers (Jan–Feb), #8:  Bad Livers (March–April), #9:  Bottle Rockets (May–June), #10:  Whiskeytown (July–Aug), #11:  Robbie Fulks (Sept–Oct), #12:  Ricky Skaggs (Nov–Dec)
1998:  #13:  Victoria Williams & Mark Olson (Jan–Feb), #14:  Alejandro Escovedo (March–April), #15:  Ralph Stanley (May–June), #16:  Lucinda Williams (July–Aug), #17:  Emmylou Harris (Sept–Oct), #18:  Golden Smog (Nov–Dec)
1999:  #19:  Don Williams (Jan–Feb), #20:  Steve Earle & Del McCoury (March–April), #21:  Old 97's (May–June), #22:  Gram Parsons (July–Aug), #23:  Buddy & Julie Miller (Sept–Oct), #24:  Dolly Parton (Nov–Dec)
2000:  #25:  5th Anniversary Issue (Jan–Feb), #26:  Jimmie Dale Gilmore (March–April), #27:  The Jayhawks (May–June), #28:  Loretta Lynn (July–Aug), #29:  Allison Moorer (Sept–Oct), #30:  Merle Haggard (Nov–Dec)
2001:  #31:  Rodney Crowell (Jan–Feb), #32:  Billy Joe Shaver (March–April), #33:  Lucinda Williams (May–June), #34:  Patty Loveless (July–Aug), #35:  Gillian Welch (Sept–Oct), #36:  Jay Farrar (Nov–Dec)
2002:  #37:  Kasey Chambers (Jan–Feb), #38:  Isaac Freeman (March–April), #39:  The Flatlanders (May–June), #40:  Kelly Willis (July–Aug), #41:  Guy Clark (Sept–Oct), #42:  Johnny Cash (Nov–Dec)
2003:  #43:  Alison Krauss (Jan–Feb), #44:  Rosanne Cash (March–April), #45:  Little Miss Cornshucks (May–June), #46:  Drive-By Truckers (July–Aug), #47:  Lyle Lovett (Sept–Oct), #48:  Bottle Rockets (Nov–Dec)
2004:  #49:  T-Bone Burnett (Jan–Feb), #50:  Patty Griffin (March–April), #51:  Loretta Lynn (May–June), #52:  Dave Alvin (July–Aug.), #53:  Willie Nelson (Sept–Oct), #54:  Iris DeMent (Nov–Dec)
2005:  #55:  Mary Gauthier (Jan–Feb), #56:  Vic Chesnutt (March–April), #57:  John Prine (May–June),
58:  Lizz Wright (July–Aug), #59:  Nickel Creek (Sept–Oct), #60:  New Orleans (Nov–Dec)
2006:  #61:  Joe Henry (Jan–Feb), #62:  Kris Kristofferson (March–April), #63:  Alejandro Escovedo & Jon Dee Graham (May–June), #64:  Allen Toussaint & Elvis Costello (July–Aug), #65:  Old Crow Medicine Show (Sept–Oct), #66:  Solomon Burke (Nov–Dec)
2007:  #67:  Lucinda Williams (Jan–Feb), #68:  The Shins (Mar–Apr), #69:  Miranda Lambert (May–June), #70:  Porter Wagoner (July–Aug), #71:  Josh Ritter (Sept–Oct), #72:  John Fogerty (Nov–Dec)
2008:  #73:  Shelby Lynne (Jan–Feb), #74:  String bands special (March–April), #75:  Buddy Miller (May–June)

References

External links
NoDepression.com
FreshGrass Album Fund
FreshGrass Foundation
FreshGrass Awards
FreshGrass Festival
Folk Alley

Bimonthly magazines published in the United States
Music magazines published in the United States
Quarterly magazines published in the United States
Magazines established in 1995
Magazines disestablished in 2008
Defunct magazines published in the United States